The United States Army Futures Command (AFC) is a United States Army command, designed as a public-private initiative, that runs modernization projects for the Army. It is headquartered in Austin, Texas, and was first commanded by General John Murray, formerly the Army's G-8; the second and current commander was formerly the Army's G-3/5/7.

As of 2018 Futures Command was focused on six priorities: 1) Long-range precision fires, 2) Next Generation Combat Vehicle, 3) Future Vertical Lift platforms,  4) a mobile & expeditionary Army network, 5) air and missile defense capabilities, and 6) soldier lethality. 
AFC's cross-functional teams (CFTs) are Futures Command's vehicle for sustainable reform of the acquisition process for the future.

By October 2021, the 40th Chief of Staff of the Army was able to project that 24 of the top 35 priority programs for modernization would be fielded in fiscal year 2023 (FY2023).

Overmatch of the capability of a competitor or adversary is one of the goals of AFC. More specifically, the imposition of multiple simultaneous dilemmas upon a competitor or adversary is a goal of the US Army: to get into a position of relative advantage. By 2021, Army leadership recognized that new Army formations (the multi-domain operations task force —MDTF) had the ability to simultaneously compete with, and also threaten an adversary, with its new capability, across domains (space, cyber, disinformation) of the conflict continuum. By 2022 or 2023, a new concept for command and control (JADC2) will have been largely prototyped.

History

U.S. Army Futures Command was activated in the summer of 2018. The Decker-Wagner report on the 2010 Army Acquisition Review (Jan 2011) listed numerous changes to the acquisition process; the recommendation to disestablish RDECOM was not followed. Instead a unitary Futures Command, to unify development over the life cycle was moved forward by an Acting Secretary of the Army (Ryan McCarthy), and the 36th Vice Chief of Staff of the Army (James McConville), who established a task force for modernization in 2016-2017 using cross-functional teams of subject matter experts to drive initial actions.See § Need for modernization reform

AFC declared its full operational capability in July 2019, after an initial one-year period. The FY2020 military budget allocated $30 billion for the top six modernization priorities over the next five years. The $30 billion came from $8 billion in cost avoidance and $22 billion in terminations. Over 30 projects are envisioned to become the materiel basis needed for overmatching any potential competitors in the 'continuum of conflict' over the next ten years, in multi-domain operations (MDO). By 2018 a fundamental strategy was formulated, involving simultaneous integrated operations across domains. This strategy involves pushing adversaries to standoff,  by presenting them with multiple simultaneous dilemmas. By 2028, the ability to project rapid, responsive power across domains will have become apparent to potential adversaries. See Power projection

From an initial 12 people at its headquarters in 2018, AFC grew to 24,000 across 25 states and 15 countries in 2019. The apparent rapid expansion came by research facilities and personnel (including ARCIC and RDECOM) migrated from other commands and parts of the Army such as the United States Army Research Laboratory.
The AFC was created in 2018 as a peer of Forces Command (FORSCOM), Training and Doctrine Command (TRADOC), and Army Materiel Command (AMC), the Army commands that provide forces, training and doctrine, and materiel respectively. The other Army commands focus on their readiness to "fight tonight" when called upon. In contrast, AFC is focused on future readiness for competition with near-peers, who have updated their capabilities. The command is supported by United States Army Reserve Innovation Command (aka. 75th Innovation Command).
See §Army of 2040

Transition to multi-domain operations (MDO) 

According to the 24th Secretary of the Army Ryan McCarthy, the three elements in Futures Command are to be:

 Futures and Concepts: assess gaps (needs versus opportunities, given a threat). Concepts for realizable future systems (with readily harvestable content) will flow into TRADOC doctrine, manuals, and training programs.
 Combat Development: stabilized concepts. Balance the current state of technology and the cash-flow requirements of the defense contractors providing the technology, that they become deliverable experiments, demonstrations, and prototypes, in an iterative process of acquisition. (See Value stream)
 Combat Systems: experiments, demonstrations, and prototypes. Transition to the acquisition, production, and sustainment programs of AMC.

23rd Secretary of the Army, Mark Esper emphasized that the 2018 administrative infrastructure for the Futures and Concepts Center (formerly ARCIC) and United States Army Combat Capabilities Development Command (CCDC, now called DEVCOM, (formerly RDECOM)) remains in place at their existing locations. What has changed or will change is the layers of command (operational control, or OPCON) needed to make a decision. He said, "You've got to remain open to change, you've got to remain flexible, you've [got] to remain accessible. That is the purpose of this command." See § Army of 2040

Cross-Functional Teams (CFTs) 
When he was 33rd Under Secretary of the Army, Ryan McCarthy characterized a Cross-Functional Team (CFT) as a team of teams, led by a requirements leader, program manager, sustainer and tester. Each CFT must strike a balance for itself amid constraints: the realms of requirements, acquisition, science and technology, test, resourcing, costing, and sustainment. A balance is needed in order for a CFT in order to produce a realizable concept before a competitor achieves it. The Army Requirements Oversight Council (AROC) itself serves as a kind of CFT, operating at a higher level as response to Congressional oversight, budgeting, funding, policy, and authorization for action.
CFTs for materiel and capabilities were first structured in a task force, in order to de-layer the Army Commands.  Each CFT addresses a capability gap, which the Army must now match for its future: there can be a Capability Development Integration Directorate (CDID), for each CFT.  Initially, the CFTs were placed as needed; eventually they might each co-locate at a Center of Excellence (CoE) listed below. For example, the Aviation CoE at Fort Rucker, in coordination with the Aviation Program Executive Officer (PEO),  also contains the Vertical Lift CFT and the Aviation CDID. 
Modernization reform is the priority for AFC, in order to achieve readiness for the future.

The CFTs will be involved in all three of AFC's elements:  Futures and concepts, Combat development, and Combat systems. "We were never above probably a total of eight people" —BG Wally Rugen, Aviation CFT. Four of the eight CFT leads have now shifted from dual-hat jobs to full-time status.  Each CFT lead is mentored by a 4-star general.

Although AFC and the CFTs are a top priority of the Department of the Army,  as AFC and the CFTs are expected to unify control of the $30 billion-dollar modernization budget, "The new command will not tolerate a zero-defects mentality. 'But if you fail, we'd like you to fail early and fail cheap,' because progress and success often builds on failure." —Ryan McCarthy Holland notes that prototyping applies to the conceptual realm ('harvestable content') as much as prototyping applies to the hardware realm.

A 2019 Government Accountability Office (GAO) report cautions that lessons learned from the CFT pilot are yet to be applied; Holland notes that this organizational critique applies to prototyping hardware, a different realm than concept refinement ("scientific research is a fundamentally different activity than technology development"). Also in 2019 the GAO recommended that the government establish a process to ensure that CFTs implement their intended business reforms; however by 2021 the office of the Chief Management officer (CMO) had been disestablished.

Joint collaboration on modernization 

The Secretaries of the Army, Air Force, and Navy meet regularly to take advantage of overlap in their programs:
Hypersonic
 Hypersonic: The US Army (August 2018) has no tested countermeasure for intercepting maneuverable hypersonic weapons platforms, and in this case the problem is being addressed in a joint program of the entire Department of Defense.  The Army is participating in a joint program with the Navy and Air Force, to develop a hypersonic glide body, by mutual agreement between the respective secretaries In order to rapidly develop this capability, a dedicated program office was established, in behalf of the joint services. A division of responsibility was agreed upon, with researchers who demonstrated hypersonic capability in 2011, teaching industrial vendors, to transfer the technology. Joint programs in hypersonic are informed by Army work; however, at the strategic level, the bulk of the hypersonic work remains at the Joint level. Long Range Precision Fires (LRPF) is an Army priority, and also a DoD joint effort. The Army and Navy's Common Hypersonic Glide Body (C-HGB) had a successful test of a prototype in March 2020. After the US realized that a catch-up effort was needed, billions of dollars were expended by 2020. A wind tunnel for testing hypersonic vehicles is being built at the Texas A&M University System' RELLIS Campus in Bryan, Texas (2019). The Army's Land-based Hypersonic Missile "is intended to have a range of 1,400 miles". By adding rocket propulsion to a shell or glide body, the joint effort shaved five years off the likely fielding time for hypersonic weapon systems. 
Countermeasures against hypersonic will require sensor data fusion: both radar and infrared sensor tracking data will be required to capture the signature of a hypersonic vehicle in the atmosphere. In 2021 the GAO counted 70 separate hypersonic projects, in both offense and defensive categories overseen by DoD's Office of the Under Secretary of Defense for Research and Engineering, which oversees only research and development, and not DoD's Under Secretary of Defense for Acquisition and Sustainment —DoD's acquisition and sustainment office, which do not need oversight until the hypersonic projects are ready for the acquisition phase.
By 2021, the Missile Defense Agency (MDA) realized that it almost had a countermeasure to hypersonic boost-glide weapons, by using existing data on the adversary hypersonic systems which were gathered from existing US satellite and ground-based sensors. MDA then fed this data into its existing systems models, and concluded that the adversary hypersonic weapon's glide phase offered the best chance for MDA to intercept it. MDA next proffered a request for information (RFI) from the defense community for building interceptors (denoted the GPI —glide phase interceptor) against the glide phase of that hypersonic weapon. GPIs would be guided by Hypersonic and Ballistic Tracking Space Sensors (HBTSS). These GPI interceptors could first be offered to the Navy for Aegis to intercept using the C2BMC, and later to the Army for THAAD to intercept using §IBCS.

Multi-Domain Operations (MDO); Joint warfighting concept (JADC2) 
Multi-Domain Operations (MDO): Joint planning and operations are also part of the impending DoD emphasis on multi-domain operations.  Multi-domain battalions,   first stood up in 2019, comprise a single unit for air, land, space,—and cyber domains. A hypersonic-based battery similar to a THAAD battery is under consideration for this type of battalion, possibly denoted a strategic fires battalion (however I2CEWS support would likely be needed), depending on the theater. In 2019, as part of a series of globally integrated exercises, these capabilities were analyzed. Using massive simulation the need for a §new kind of command and control (now denoted JADC2) to integrate this firepower was explored.
The ability to punch-through any standoff defense of a near-peer competitor is the goal which Futures Command is seeking. For example, the combination of F-35-based targeting coordinates, Long range precision fires, and Low-earth-orbit satellite capability overmatches the competition, according to Lt. Gen. Wesley. Critical decisions to meet this goal will be decided by data from the results of the Army's ongoing tests of the prototypes under development.
For example, in Long Range Precision Fires (LRPF), the director of the LRPF CFT envisions one application as an anti-access/area denial (A2AD)  probe; this spares resources from the other services; by firing a munition with a thousand-mile range at an adversary, LRPF would force an adversary to respond, which exposes the locations of its countermeasures, and might even expose the location of an adversary force's headquarters. In that situation an adversary's headquarters would not survive for long, and the adversary's forces would be subject to defeat in detail. But LRPF is only one part of the strategy of overmatch by a Combatant commander.
In August–September 2020. at Yuma Proving Ground, the US Army engaged in a five-week exercise to rapidly merge capabilities in multiple-domains. The exercise prototyped a ground tactical Network, pushing it to its limits of robustness (as of 2020, 36 miles on the ground, and demonstrated 1500-mile capability above the ground, with kill chains measured in seconds) in the effort to penetrate anti-access/area denial (A2AD) with long-range fires. Longer-range fires are under development, ranging from hundreds of miles to over 1000 miles, with yearly iterations of Project Convergence being planned. 
 MDO (multi-domain operations) and JADC2 (joint all-domain command and control) thus entails:
 Penetrate phase: satellites detect enemy shooters
 Dis-integrate phase: airborne assets remove enemy long range fires
 Kinetic effect phase: Army shooters, using targeting data from aircraft and other sensors, fire on enemy targets.
 Army Chief of Staff Gen. James C. McConville will discuss the combination of MDO and JADC2 with Air Force Chief of Staff Gen. Charles Q. Brown. In October 2020 the Chiefs agreed that Futures Command, and the Air Force's A5 office will lead a two-year collaboration 'at the most "basic levels" by defining mutual standards for data sharing and service interfacing' in the development of Combined Joint All-Domain Command and Control (CJADC2).
 The ability of the joint services to send data from machine to machine was exercised in front of several of the Joint Chiefs of Staff in April 2021; this is a prerequisite capability for Convergence of MDO and JADC2.
 In July 2022 the 7th ASA(ALT) Doug Bush called for the formation of a large office on the scale of the Joint Counter-small UAS office, but for JADC2. This would coordinate, and eventually reconcile requirements for JADC2 for Army's Project Convergence, the Navy's Project Overmatch and the Air Force's Advanced Battle Management System. See CDAO
  In July 2022 Army Test and Evaluation Command called for more digital twinning and modeling and simulation, as end-to-end tests become more comprehensive, expensive, and larger-scale; as the scale of an exercise increases, a Synthetic Training Environment (STE) can be used to cut costs.

Partners 

AFC is actively seeking partners outside the military, including research funding to over 300 colleges and universities, but with one-year program cycles. "We will come to you. You don't have to come to us. —General Mike Murray, 24 August 2018"
Multiple incubator tech hubs are available in Austin,
especially Capital Factory, with offices of Defense Innovation Unit (DIU) and AFWERX (USAF tech hub).   Gen. Murray will stand up an Army Applications Lab there to accelerate acquisition and deployment of materiel to the soldiers, using artificial intelligence (AI)
 as one acceleration technique; Murray will hire a chief technology officer for AFC. Gen. Murray, in seeking to globalize AFC, has embedded U.S. military allies into some of the CFTs.
For the US, and its allies and partners, the basis of global surveillance and target acquisition is the US National Defense Space Architecture (NDSA) as realized by layered constellations of Earth satellites and Earth stations (such as TITAN). It will take machine learning (ML) and AI to handle the scale of data flows needed for MDO.
AI 
§ Robotic combat vehicles (RCVs) have an updated guideline —DoDD 3000.09 (2023).
Disinformation at scale appears to be AI-generated, in 2021.
Artificial Intelligence (AI) Modernization—The 23rd Secretary of the Army directed the establishment of an Army AI Task Force (A-AI TF) to support the DoD Joint AI center. The execution order will be drafted and staffed by Futures Command:
The Army Applications Laboratory was established in 2018, along with the stand-up of the Army Futures Command, to act as a concierge service across the Army's Future Force Modernization Enterprise and the broader commercial marketplace of ideas.
 Army AI task force (its relationship with the CFTs is cross-cutting, in the same sense as the Assured Position, Navigation, Timing (A-PNT) CFT and the Synthetic Training Environment (STE) CFT are also cross-cutting) will use the resources of the Army to establish scalable machine learning projects at Carnegie Mellon University
 the Army CIO/G-6 will create an Identity, Credential, and Access Management system to efficiently issue and verify credentials to non-person entities (AI agents and machines)
 DCS G-2 will coordinate with CG AFC, and director of A-AI TF, to provide intelligence for Long-Range Precision Fires
 CG AMC will provide functional expertise and systems for maintenance of materiel with AI
 AFC and A-AI TF will establish an AI test bed for experimentation, training, deployment, and testing of machine learning capabilities and workflows. Funding will be assured for the Fiscal Year 2019.
A Global Network to counter cyber attacks, much like Five Eyes, is the recommendation for multi-domain operations (MDO), which is unified to present a synoptic view of any cyber operation to all the combatant commands simultaneously. 'Decision dominance' is a tenet of the 'Joint warfighting concept'. 
 Defense Advanced Research Projects Agency (DARPA) AlphaDogfight: Trials of eight AI teams, which began learning how to fly in September 2019. In August 2020 the eight AI agents faced each other, in a series of simulated fights. The simulations included the g-forces which limit a human (accelerations greater than 9 g's will cause most forward-facing human pilots to black out—  AI agents are not subject to these human constraints). The champion AI agent eventually met a human General Dynamics F-16 Fighting Falcon fighter pilot in simulated combat on 20 August 2020. On 20 August 2020, the champion AI agent consistently defeated a human F-16 pilot in a series of dogfights.
 DoD's Joint AI Center (JAIC) is providing a Joint Common Foundation, a cloud-based AI toolkit for any DoD organization  (viz., Futures Command) to use. JAIC is seeking to curate the flood of data at DoD to allow systematic, reliable datasets which are usable for machine learning.
 Adaptive Distributed Allocation of Probabilistic Tasks (ADAPT) is a DARPA model for testing AI-to-human communication in a toy environment.
In 2021 DoD is requesting 600 separate AI efforts for FY2022 ($874 million) as opposed to 400 AI efforts for FY2021. The Army is using machine learning to extract targeting data from satellite sensors for its JADC2 effort.
In 2022 DEVCOM Analysis Center (DAC) signed a cooperative agreement with Northeastern University's Kostas Research Institute (KRI) to build on KRI's analytic framework, with six other universities on artificial intelligence and assistive automation (AI/AA), to further Army sub-goals ("mission effectiveness analysis, ontology for decision making, automatic target recognition, human systems integration, cyber resilience/electronic warfare threat defense, and assessing autonomous maneuver/mobility").  
 Software
Futures Command will stand up Army Software Factory in August 2021, to immerse Soldiers and Army civilians of all ranks in modern software development, in Austin. Similar in spirit to the Training with industry program, participants are expected to take these practices back with them, to influence other Army people in their future assignments, and to build up the Army's capability in software development. The training program lasts three years, and will produce skill sets for trainees as product managers, user experience and user interface designers, software engineers, or platform engineers. The Al Work Force Development program and this Software Factory will complement the Artificial Intelligence Task Force.
 Tapping in to its personnel system, the Army has identified soldiers who can already code at Ph.D.-level, but who are in unexpected MOSs.
  In March 2023 the Marine Corps co-located its software factory with the Army software factory in Austin, Texas.

AFC is seeking to design signature systems in a relevant time frame according to priorities of the Chief of Staff of the Army (CSA). AFC will partner with other organizations such as Defense Innovation Unit Experimental (DIUx) as needed. 
If a team from industry presents a viable program idea to a CFT, that CFT connects to the Army's requirements developers, Secretary Esper said, and the program prototype is then put on a fast track.
The Secretary of the Army has approved an Intellectual Property Management Policy, to protect both the Army and the entrepreneur or innovator.
 Data

For example, the Network CFT and the Program Executive Office Command, Control, Communications—Tactical (PEO C3T) hosted a forum on 1 August 2018 for vendors to learn what might function as a testable/deployable in the near future. A few of the hundreds of white papers from the vendors, adjudged to be 'very mature ideas', were passed to the Army's acquisition community, while many others were passed to United States Army Communications-Electronics Research, Development and Engineering Center (CERDEC) for continuation in the Army's effort to modernize the network for combat. Although some test requirements were inappropriately applied, the Command post computing environment (CPCE) has passed a hurdle.

While seeking information, the Army is especially interested in ideas that accelerate an acquisition program —in for example the Future Vertical Lift Requests for Information (RFIs): "provide a detailed description of tailored, alternative or innovative approaches that streamlines the acquisition process to accelerate the program as much as possible" (4 April 2019);  in January 2020 the current Optionally manned fighting vehicle (OMFV) solicitation was cancelled when the OMFV's requirements added up to an unobtainable project; in February 2020 Futures command was soliciting the industry for do-able ideas for an OMFV, whereas in August 2022 Army Network modernization was the target for being speeded-up.
Search for capabilities
In the Army's search for capabilities, 6th ASA(ALT) Bruce Jette initiated xTechsearch to reward private innovators. The program is ongoing.

The COVID-19 pandemic triggered the Army to run an  Ventilator Challenge; entrants can submit their ideas online for immediate consideration and a possible cash prize to encourage participation for a $100,000 prize and possible Army contract. In 1964 Henrik H. Straub of Harry Diamond Labs, a predecessor to CCDC Army Research Laboratory, invented the Army Emergency Respirator (now termed a 'ventilator' in current terminology). This ventilator is one application of the fluidic amplifier (a 1957 Harry Diamond Labs invention), which allows the labored breathing of the patient to control the flow from an externally purified air stream, to augment the air flow into a patient's lungs.

TRX Systems won an  award for technology which allows navigation in a GPS-denied environment, an A-PNT priority. The award was delayed by the COVID-19 pandemic, which allowed the company more time for business development.
Air-launched effects (ALEs)
Air-launched effects (ALEs) are drones which are launched from the Army's helicopters. In swarms, ALEs promise to multiply the combat effectiveness of the Army's helicopters; single ground-launched drones have already been used in combat during the 2022 Russian invasion of Ukraine, for intelligence, surveillance, and reconnaissance. ALEs have been used as munitions, as in the Nagorno-Karabakh conflicts.

Robotic combat vehicles (RCVs)
 In 2021 candidate Robotic combat vehicles (RCVs), both medium and light RCVs, along with surrogate heavy RCVs (modified M-113s) and proxy manned control vehicles (MET-Ds) were to marshal at Camp Grayling MI to test a company-sized tele-operated / unmanned formation. The light RCVs had their autonomous driving software installed in November and December 2020. The robotic vehicle formation begins a shakeout in April 2021. The RCVs (and the software, which is common to all 18 vehicles) enters ATEC (Army Test and Evaluation Command) safety testing through May 2022. Live-fire drills are scheduled to conclude in August 2022. By October 2021 experiments with RCVs, in concert with drones for intelligence, surveillance, and reconnaissance (ISR), were underway.

By June 2022 Army RCVs had demonstrated some of their disruptive capabilities, in preparation for Project Convergence 2022. Autonomous capabilities, for example in resupply by unmanned helicopters, by the US, Australia, and UK were demonstrated at PC22.

AFC events  
By 13 October 2021 the 40th Chief of Staff of the Army could announce that the majority of the Army's Futures Command's 31 signature systems, and the four rapid capability projects of the § Rapid Capabilities and Critical Technologies Office would be fielded by fiscal year 2023 (FY2023).

By 2022, Futures Command was conducting the third annual iteration of Project Convergence (PC22), experiments and joint tests of 300 technologies by the Department of Defense and its allies and partners. The next Project Convergence is likely to be PC24 at the earliest.

Acquisition
See United States Army Acquisition Corps

Futures Command partners with the ASA(ALT), who, in the role of the Army Acquisition Executive (AAE), has milestone decision authority (MDA) at multiple points in a Materiel development decision (MDD). Thus, from the perspective of AFC, which seeks to modernize, they consolidate the relevant expertise into the relevant CFT. The CFT balances the constraints needed to realize a prototype, beginning with realizable requirements, science and technology, test, etc. before entering the acquisition process (typically the Army prototypes on its own and, as of 2019, initiates acquisition at Milestone B in order to have the Acquisition Executive, with the concurrence of the Army Chief of Staff, decide on production as a Program of Record at Milestone C). Next, refine the prototype to address the factors needed to pass the Milestone decisions A, B, and C which require Milestone decision authority (MDA) in an acquisition process. This consolidation of expertise thus reduces the risks in a Materiel development decision (MDD), for the Army to admit a prototype into a program of record.) The existing processes (as of April 2018) for a Materiel development decision (MDD) have been updated to clarify their place in the Life Cycle of a program of record: over 1200 programs/projects were reviewed; by October 2019, over 600 programs of record have been moved from the acquisition (development for modernization) phase to the sustainment phase (for mature projects, to continue their manufacture and fielding to the brigades). An additional life cycle management action is underway, to re-examine which of these projects/programs should be divested. (Surplus materiel might well go to the Security Assistance Command, perhaps to Foreign Military Sales.)

The emphasis remains with Futures Command, which selects programs to develop. In order to achieve its mission of achieving overmatch, each Futures Command CFT partners with the acquisition community. This community (the Army acquisition workforce (AAW))  includes an entire Army branch (the Acquisition Corps), U.S. Army Acquisition Support Center (USAASC), Army Contracting Command, .  The Principal Military Deputy to the ASA(ALT) is also deputy commanding general for Combat Systems, Army Futures Command, and leads the Program Executive Officers (PEO); he has directed each PEO who does not have a CFT to coordinate with, to immediately form one, at least informally.

The PEOs work closely with their respective CFTs. The list of CFTs and PEOs below is incomplete. 
Operationally, the CFTs offer "de-layering" (fewer degrees of separation between the echelons of the Army—Rugen estimates two degrees of separation), and provide a point of contact (POC) for Army reformers interested in adding value in the midst of constraints to be balanced while modernizing. "... and if we're really good, we'll continue to adapt. Year over year over year." —Secretary Esper (See Value stream.)

Prototyping and experimentation
"Our new approach is really to prototype as much as we can to help us identify requirements, so our reach doesn't exceed our grasp. ... A good example is Future Vertical Lift: The prototyping has been exceptional." —Secretary of the Army Mark Esper. The development process will be cyclic, consisting of prototype, demonstration/testing, and evaluation, in an iterative process designed to unearth unrealistic requirements early, before prematurely including that requirement in a program of record.

AFC activities include at least one Cross-functional team, its Capability development integration directorate (CDID), and the associated Battle Lab, for each  (Army Center of Excellence (CoE)) respectively.  Each CDID and associated Battle Lab work with their CFT to develop operational experiments and prototypes to test.

ASA(ALT), in coordination with AFC, has dotted-line relationships between its PEOs and the CFTs. In particular, the Rapid Capabilities and Critical Technologies Office of ASA(ALT) has a PEO who is charged with developing experimental prototype 'units of action' for rapid fielding to the Soldiers. The prototypes are currently for Long range hypersonic weapons, High energy laser defense, and Space, as of June 2019, Speed and range are the Army capabilities which are being augmented, with spending on these capabilities tripling between 2017 and 2019.

Tests are run by JMC and White Sands Missile Range, which hosts ATEC. As United States Army Test and Evaluation Command (ATEC) reports directly to the Army Chief of Staff, the test support level from ATEC is to be specified by the CFT, or PEO. Fort Bliss and WSMR together cover 3.06 million acres, large enough to test every non-nuclear weapon system in the Army inventory.
JMC runs live developmental experiments to test and assess MDO concepts or capabilities that support the Army's six modernization priorities which are then analyzed by The Research and Analysis Center, denoted TRAC based out of Fort Leavenworth, or AMSAA, denoted the Data Analysis Center at APG. CCDC, now called DEVCOM (formerly RDECOM, at APG) includes the several Army research laboratory locations (ARLs), as well as research, development and engineering centers (RDECs) listed:

In internal partnerships, CCDC, now called DEVCOM (formerly RDECOM) has taken Long range precision fires (LRPF) as its focus in aligning its organizations (the six research, development and engineering centers (RDECs), and the Army Research Laboratory (ARL)); as of September 2018, RDECOM's 'concept of operation' is first to support the LRPF CFT, with ARDEC. AMRDEC is looking to improve the energetics and efficiency of projectiles. TARDEC Ground Vehicle Center is working on high-voltage components for Extended range cannon artillery (ERCA) that save on size and weight. Two dedicated RDECOM people support the LRPF CFT, with reachback support from two dozen more at RDECOM. In January 2019 RDECOM was reflagged as CCDC; General Mike Murray noted that CCDC will have to support more Soldier feedback, and that prototyping and testing will have to begin before a project ever becomes a program of record.

Although the Army Research Laboratory has not changed its name, Secretary Esper notes that the CCDC objectives supersede the activities of the Laboratory; the Laboratory remains in its support role for the top-six priorities for modernizing combat capabilities.

Acquisition specialists are being encouraged to accept lateral transfers to the several research, development and engineering centers (RDECs), where their skills are needed: Ground vehicle systems center (formerly TARDEC, at Detroit Arsenal. Michigan), Aviation and missile center (formerly AMRDEC, at Redstone Arsenal), C5ISR center (formerly CERDEC, at Aberdeen Proving Ground), Soldier center (formerly NSRDEC, Natick, MA), and Armaments center (formerly ARDEC, at Picatinny Arsenal) listed below.

AFC branch locations

The following activities for Futures Command are at 23 locations. (A US Army center of excellence (CoE), or TRADOC Center of Excellence, can be co-located near a CFT, along with the associated Capability Development Integration Directorate (CDID) and "Battle Lab") The interrelation between AFC and TRADOC can be seen by the role of a TRADOC Capability manager, who is responsible for DOTMLPF, and reports to the TRADOC commander.
 AFC HQ, Austin TX
 AFSG Army Future Studies Group, 2530 Crystal Dr, Arlington, VA 22202
  Futures and Concepts Center of AFC, formerly ARCIC Fort Eustis VA
 JMC Joint Modernization Command, Fort Bliss, which is contiguous to WSMR
 White Sands Missile Range NM, also houses ARL, TRAC, and Army Test and Evaluation Command. 
 FT LVN Operations research: Mission Command Battle Lab,  Capability development integration directorate (CDID), The Research Analysis Center (TRAC), formerly TRADOC Analysis Center, Fort Leavenworth KS
 CFT: Synthetic Training Environment (STE): The HQ for STE has opened in Orlando (28 January 2019). 
 CCOE Cyber CoE - (its CDID and Battle Lab), Fort Gordon GA
 CFT: Mobile and Expeditionary Network
 MCOE Maneuver CoE  - (its CDID and Battle Lab), Fort Benning GA
 CFT:  Next Generation Combat Vehicle (NGCV)
 CFT:  Soldier Lethality
 AVNCOE Aviation CoE  - (its CDID), at Fort Rucker
 CFT:  Future Vertical Lift (FVL)
 FCOE Fires CoE  - (its CDID and Battle Lab), Doctrine updates to support strategic fires Fort Sill OK
 CFT:  Long Range Precision Fires (LRPF)
 CFT:  Air and Missile Defense
 ICOE Intelligence CoE  - (its CDID), Fort Huachuca AZ
 MSCOE Maneuver Support CoE  - (its CDID and Battle Lab), Fort Leonard Wood MO
 SCOE Sustainment CoE  - (its CDID), Fort Lee VA
 APG Aberdeen Proving Ground, Aberdeen MD, also houses Combat Capabilities Development Command (CCDC, now called DEVCOM), formerly RDECOM, Army Materiel Systems Analysis Activity (AMSAA), and C5ISR center (the Command, Control, Communications, Computers, Cyber, Intelligence, Surveillance and Reconnaissance Center was formerly CERDEC)
 CFT:  Assured Positioning, Navigation and Timing (A-PNT)
 CFT:  Network CFT (N-CFT)
 CFT:  Long Range Precision Fires,
 CCDC Armaments Center (formerly Armament research, development and engineering center—ARDEC), Picatinny Arsenal, PEO AMMO, and the Cross Functional Team for Long Range Precision Fires
 CFT:  Long Range Precision Fires
 CCDC Ground Vehicle Systems Center  (formerly Tank Automotive research, development and engineering center—TARDEC), Detroit Arsenal (Warren, Michigan)
 CFT:  Next Generation Combat Vehicle (NGCV)
 Army Aviation and Missile Center (formerly Aviation and Missile research, development and engineering center—AMRDEC), Redstone Arsenal, Huntsville AL
 CFT:  Air and Missile Defense
 CCDC Soldier Center (formerly Natick Soldier research, development and engineering center—NSRDEC), General Greene Ave, Natick, MA
 Army Research Laboratory (ARL), Adelphi MD 
 ARL-Orlando Army Research Laboratory, Orlando FL
 ARL West, Playa Vista CA
 ARL-RTP Army Research Laboratory, Raleigh-Durham NC
 AI task force at Carnegie-Mellon University

Need for modernization reform

Between 1995 and 2009, $32 billion was expended on programs such as the Future Combat System (2003-2009), with no harvestable content by the time of its cancellation. As of 2021, the Army had not fielded a new combat system in decades.

23rd Secretary of the Army Mark Esper has remarked that AFC will provide the unity of command and purpose needed to reduce the requirements definition phase from 60 months to 12 months. 
A simple statement of a problem (rather than a full-blown requirements definition) that the Army is trying to address may suffice for a surprising, usable solution. —General Mike Murray, paraphrasing Trae Stephens (One task will be to quantify the lead time for identifying a requirement; the next task would then be to learn how to reduce that lead time.—Gap analysis ) Process changes are expected. The development process will be cyclic, consisting of prototype, demonstration/testing, and evaluation, in an iterative process designed to unearth unrealistic requirements early, before prematurely including that requirement in a program of record. The 6th ASA(ALT) Bruce Jette has cautioned the acquisition community to 'call-out' unrealistic processes which commit a program to a drawn-out failure, rather than failing early, and seeking another solution.

Secretary Esper scrubbed through 800 modernization programs to reprioritize funding for the top six modernization priorities, which will consume 80% of the modernization funding,  of eighteen systems.  IVAS was slowed during the 2022 Russian invasion of Ukraine in March 2022. Secretary McCarthy had cautioned that a stopgap 2019 Continuing resolution (CR) would halt development of some of the critical modernization projects. Realistically, budget considerations will restrict the fielding of new materiel to one Armor BCT per year; at that rate, updates would take decades. The Budget Control Act (BCA) expires in 2022. The "night court" budget review process realigned $2.4 billion for modernization away from programs which were not tied to modernization or to the 2018 National Defense Strategy. The total FY2021 budget request of $178 billion is $2 billion less than the enacted FY2020 budget of $180 billion.

The CIO/G6 has targeted Futures Command (Austin) in 2019 as the first pilot for "enterprise IT-as-a-service"-style service contracts;  General Murray now (July 2019) has a sensitive compartmented information facility in his headquarters, as a result of this pilot. Two other locations are to be announced for 2019. Six to eight other pilots are envisioned for 2020. However, 288 other enterprise network locations remain to be migrated away from the previous "big bang" migration concept from several years ago, as they are vulnerable to near-peer cyber threats. The CIO/G6 emphasizes that this enterprise migration is not the tactical network espoused in the top six priorities (a 'mobile & expeditionary Army network').
After AFC, the following G6 service contracts are high priority:
The Combat Training Centers (Fort Irwin, Fort Polk, and Grafenwöhr)
TRADOC and its Centers of Excellence (CoEs)
The power projection bases from which deployments spring

By February 2020 the 37th Vice Chief of Staff could assess that Army modernization was perceptibly speeding up.

Silos

Chief Milley noted that AFC would actively reach out into the community in order to learn, and that Senator John McCain's frank criticism of the acquisition process was instrumental for modernization reform at Futures command. In fact, AFC soldiers would blend into Austin by not wearing their uniforms [to work side by side with civilians in the tech hubs],  Milley noted on 24 August 2018 press conference. Secretary Esper said he expected failures during the process of learning how to reform the acquisition and modernization process; the Network CFT and PEO have detected a process failure in the DOT&E requirements process: some test requirements were inappropriately applied.

In the Department of Defense, the materiel supply process was underwritten by the acquisition, logistics, and technology directorate of the Office of the Secretary of Defense (OSD), with a deputy secretary of defense (DSD) to oversee five areas, one of them being acquisition, logistics, and technology (ALT). ALT is overseen by an under secretary of defense (USD). (Each of the echelons at the level of DSD and USD serve at the pleasure of the president, as does the secretary of defense (SECDEF).) The Defense Acquisition University (DAU) trains acquisition professionals for the Army as well.

In 2016 when RDECOM reported to AMC (instead of to AFC, as it does as of 2018), AMC instituted Life cycle management command (LCMC) of three of RDECOM's centers for aviation and missiles, electronics, and tanks: AMRDEC, CERDEC, and TARDEC respectively, as well as the three contracting functions for the three centers.

This Life Cycle Management (formulated in 2004) was intended to exert the kind of operational control (OPCON) needed just for the sustainment function (AMC's need for Readiness today), rather than for its relevance to modernization for the future, which is the focus of AFC. AFC now serves as the deciding authority when moving a project in its Life Cycle, out of the Acquisition phase and into the Sustainment phase.

Due to the COVID-19 pandemic, the Acquisition Executive, and the AFC commander created a COVID-19 task force to try to project supplier problems 30, 60, and 90 days out; they are respectively tracking 800 programs, and 35 priorities on a daily basis.

Relevance for modernization
The CFTs,  as prioritized 1 through 6 by the Chief of Staff of the Army (CSA), each have to consider constraints: a balance of requirements, acquisition, science and technology, test, resourcing, costing, and sustainment.

The Doctrine, Organization, Training, Materiel, Leadership and education, Personnel and Facilities (DOTMLPF) method of mission planning was instituted to quantify tradeoffs in joint planning. TRADOC's Mission Command CoE uses DOTMLPF. 
DOTMLPF will be used for modernization of the Army beyond materiel alone, which (as of 2019) is the current focus of the CFTs.
The updated modernization strategy, to move from concept to doctrine as well, will be unveiled by summer 2019.
DOTMLPF (doctrine, organization, training, materiel, leadership and education, personnel, and facilities) itself is planned as a driver for modernization. The plan is to have an MDO-capable Army by 2028, and an MDO-ready Army by 2035.

TRADOC, ASA (ALT), and AFC are tied together in this process, according to 36th Vice Chief McConville. AFC will have to be "a little bit disruptive [but not upsetting to the existing order]" in order to institute reforms within budget in a timely way.

The Assistant Secretary of the Army for acquisition, logistics, and technology —ASA (ALT)— is the civilian executive overseeing both the acquisition and the sustainment processes of the Department of the Army (as of 2018: Dr. Bruce Jette was 6th ASA(ALT)). The ASA(ALT) will coordinate the acquisition portion of modernization reform with AFC.

Congress has given the Army Other Transaction Authority (OTA), which allows the PEOs to enter into Full Rate Production quicker by permitting the services to control their own programs of record, rather than DoD. This strips out one layer of bureaucracy as of 2018.
MTA (middle tier acquisition authority) is another tool available to Program Managers and Contracting Officers.

Besides the AFC CFTS, the Army Requirements Oversight Council (AROC) could also play a part in acquisition reform; as of September 2018 the Deputy Chief of Staff G-8 (DCS G-8), who leads AROC and JROC (Joint Requirements Oversight Council) has aligned with the priorities of AFC.
The DCS G-8 is principal military advisor to the ASA (FM&C).

In addition, the Program Executive Officers (PEOs) of ASA (ALT) are to maintain a dotted-line relationship (i.e., coordination) with Futures Command.
 	
There is now a PEO for Rapid Capabilities, to get rapid turnaround. The Rapid Capabilities Office (RCO)'s PEO gets two program managers, one for rapid prototyping, and one for rapid acquisition, of a capability. The Rapid capabilities office (RCO) does not develop its own requirements; rather, the RCO gets the requirements from the Cross-functional team (CFT).  Rapid Capabilities (RCO) was headed by Tanya Skeen as PEO RCO but Skeen moved to DoD, in late 2018. In 2019 RCO became the Rapid Capabilities and Critical Technologies Office (RCCTO) Redstone Arsenal, headed by LTG L. Neil Thurgood, lately of ASA (ALT)'s Army Hypersonics office.

Progress toward MDO
Then-CG of Army Futures Command (AFC) Gen. Murray announced full operational capability (FOC) 31 July 2019. By 2021 the Army's 40th Chief of Staff could lay out Waypoint 2028, and Aimpoint 2035 for the Army.
 
The Army G8 is monitoring just how producible (Milestone C) the upcoming materiel will be; for the moment, the G8 is funding the materiel.  Follow-up on Modernization reviews is forthcoming, on a regular basis, according to the G8.

The progress in the top six priorities (long-range precision fires, Next Generation Combat Vehicle, Future Vertical Lift platforms, a mobile & expeditionary Army network, air & missile defense capabilities, and soldier lethality) being:

Long Range Precision Fires 
According to AFC, the mission of the Long Range Precision Fires (LRPF) CFT is to "deliver cutting-edge surface-to-surface (SSM) fires systems that will significantly increase range and effects over currently fielded US and adversary systems."

AFC's five major programs for LRPF are:

 The Extended Range Cannon Artillery (ERCA) program which develops a system capable of firing accurately at targets beyond 70 km as opposed to the M109A7's 30 km current range
 The Precision Strike Mission (PrSM) which is a precision-strike guided SSM fired from the M270A1 MLRS and M142 HIMARS doubling the present rate-of-fire with two missiles per launch pod
 The Strategic Long-Range Cannon (SLRC) program, which would have developed a system that could have fired a hypersonic projectile up to 1,000 miles against air defense, artillery, missile systems, and command and control targets was terminated 23 May 2022.
 The Common-Hypersonic Glide Body (C-HGB) is a collaborative program between the Army, Navy, Air Force, and Missile Defense Agency (MDA) which is planned to become the base of the Long-Range Hypersonic Weapon (LRHW) program
 A ground-launchable UGM-109 Tomahawk Land Attack Missile, as well as the SM-6 (RIM-174 Standard ERAM) to fill the gap in the Army's mid-range missile capabilities has been delivered to RCCTO.

Based on Futures Command's development between July 2018 and December 2020, by 2023 the earliest versions of these weapons will be fielded:

The kill chains will take less than 1 minute, from detection of the target, to execution of the fires command; these operations will have the capability to precisely strike "command centers, air defenses, missile batteries, and logistics centers" nearly simultaneously.
 The speed of battle damage assessment will depend on the travel time of the munition. This capability depends on the ability of a specialized CFT, Assured precision navigation and timing (APNT) to provide detail.
 Precision Strike Missiles (PrSMs) can reach in excess of 150 miles, with current 2020 tests
 Mid-range capability (MRC) fires can reach in excess of 500 to 1000 miles, using mature Navy missiles
 Long-Range Hypersonic Weapons (LRHWs) are to have a range greater than 1725 miles.

The current M109A6 "Paladin" howitzer range is doubled in the M109A7 variant. An operational test of components of the Long range cannon was scheduled for 2020. The LRC is complementary to Extended range cannon artillery (ERCA), the M1299 Extended Range Cannon Artillery howitzer. Baseline ERCA is to enter service in 2023.  Investigations for ERCA in 2025: rocket-boosted artillery shells: Tests of the Multiple launch rocket system (MLRS) XM30 rocket shell have demonstrated a near-doubling of the range of the munition, using the Tail controlled guided multiple launch rocket system, or TC-G. The TRADOC capability manager (TCM) Field Artillery Brigade - DIVARTY has been named a command position.
An autoloader for ERCA's 95-pound shells is under development at Picatinny Arsenal, to support a sustained firing rate of 10 rounds a minute  A robotic vehicle for carrying the shells is a separate effort at Futures Command's Army Applications Lab.
 The Precision Strike Missile (PrSM) is intended to replace the Army Tactical Missile System (MGM-140 ATACMS) in 2023. PrSM flight testing is delayed beyond 2 August 2019, the anticipated date for the expiration of the Intermediate-range Nuclear Forces Treaty, which set 499 kilometer limits on intermediate-range missiles. (David Sanger and Edward Wong projected that the earliest test of a longer range missile could be a ground-launched version of a Tomahawk cruise missile, followed by a test of a mobile ground launched IRBM with a range of 1800–2500 miles before year-end 2019.) The 2020 National Defense Authorization Act (NDAA) was approved on 9 December 2019, which allowed the Pentagon to continue testing such missiles in FY2020. The Lockheed PrSM prototype had its first launch on 10 December 2019 at White Sands Missile Range, in a 150-mile test, and an overhead detonation; the Raytheon PrSM prototype was delayed from its planned November launch, and Raytheon has now withdrawn from the PrSM risk reduction phase. The PrSM's range and accuracy, the interfaces to HIMARS launcher, and test software, met expectations. PrSM passed Milestone B on 1 October 2021. Baseline PrSM is to enter service in 2023; an upgraded version of PrSM, with multi-mode seekers will then be sought.
 For targets beyond the PrSM's range, the Army's RCCTO will seek a mid-range missile prototype by 2023, with a reach from 1000 to 2000 miles. Loren Thompson points out that a spectrum of medium-range to long-range weapons will be available to the service by 2023; RCCTO's prototype Mid-Range Capability (MRC) battery will field mature Navy missiles, likely for the Indo-Pacific theater in FY2023. DARPA is developing OpFires, an intermediate-range hypersonic weapon which is shorter-range than the Army's LRHW. DARPA is seeking a role in the armory for OpFires' throttle-able rocket motor, post-2023. DARPA announced in July 2022 it successfully tested its OpFires hypersonic weapon at White Sands Missile Range (WSMR) for the first time. The OpFires launch was from a Marine Corps logistics truck. OpFires will "rapidly and precisely engage critical, time-sensitive targets while penetrating modern enemy air defenses", potentially to be launched from a High Mobility Artillery Rocket System (HIMARS) launcher.  These weapons will likely require planning for new Army (or Joint) formations. 
 The Long range hypersonic weapons (LRHWs) will use precision targeting data against anti-access area denial (A2AD) radars and other critical infrastructure of near-peer competitors by 2023. LRHW does depend on stable funding.
Advanced Field Artillery Tactical Data System (AFATDS) 7.0 is the vehicle for a Multi-domain task force's artillery battery very similar to a THAAD battery: beginning in 2020, these batteries will train for a hypersonic glide vehicle which is common to the Joint forces. The Long range hypersonic weapon (LRHW) glide vehicle is to be launched from transporter erector launchers. Tests of the Common hypersonic glide body (C-HGB) to be used by the Army and Navy were meeting expectations in 2020. 
In August 2020 the director of Assured precision navigation and timing (APNT) CFT announced tests which integrate the entire fires kill chain, from initial detection to final destruction. William B. Nelson announced the flow of satellite data from the European theater (Germany), and AI processing of AFATDS targeting data to the fires units.
In September 2020 an AI kill chain was formulated in seconds; a hypervelocity (speeds up to Mach 5) munition, launched from a descendant of the Paladin, intercepted a cruise missile surrogate.
Three flight tests of LRHW were scheduled in 2021; that plan was changed to one test in late 2021, followed by a multi-missile test in 2022.
The LRHW has been named 'Dark Eagle' The first LRHW battery will start to receive its first operational rounds in early FY2023; all eight rounds for this battery will have been delivered by FY2023. By then, the PEO Missiles and Space will have picked up the LRHW program, for batteries two and three in FY'25 and FY'27, respectively. Battery one will first train, and then participate in the LRHW flight test launches in FY'22 and FY'23.

Next Generation Combat Vehicle 

Next Generation Combat Vehicle (NGCV) portfolio:

The use of modular protection is a move toward modular functionality for combat vehicles.

 At Yuma Proving Ground (YPG), Firestorm (a Project Convergence AI node) sent targeting coordinates to Remote Weapons Stations, which were proxies for the Robotic Combat Vehicles and Optionally Manned Fighting Vehicles. A CROWS was slewed to the aimpoint, awaiting the human commander's order to fire. Firestorm aids and partakes of the Common operational picture (COP) shared by the AI hub at Joint Base Lewis-McChord. Satellite-based,  F-35 based, and Army ground-based targeting data were shared in real-time during Firestorm's operation with the AI hubs to produce effects at YPG.

Firestorm was made possible by a mesh network—improvising a medium earth orbit (MEO, at 1200 mile altitude), and then a geosynchronous earth orbit (GEO, at 22,000 mile altitude) satellite link between Joint Base Lewis-McChord to Yuma Proving Ground.
Armored Multi-Purpose Vehicle (AMPV): in Limited User Tests General purpose variant supports Blue force tracking 
An Advanced Powertrain Demonstrator, compact enough for AMPVs, Bradleys, OMFVs, or RCVs, can generate 1,000 horsepower from diesel. Alternatively, the demonstrator can generate electrical power: 160 kiloWatts for SHORAD high-energy lasers, or for propulsion of a 50-ton vehicle in quiet mode, for brief periods. 
A ground mobility vehicle competition, bids closing 26 October 2018

The JLTV was approved for full rate production in June 2019.  Joint Modernization Command (JMC) is supporting a TCM Stryker study on the optimum number of JLTVs for light infantry brigades.
Electrification microgrid standards
AFC's Futures and concepts center is proposing a strategy to guide the electrification of the GCVs, using the JLTV as an example for a step-by-step pathway and transition plan for electrification. Loren Thompson cautions that electrification per se could harm further fielding due to scope creep in specifications for the JLTV. The Army has not requested a hybrid electric JLTV.

The Maneuver CDID (MCDID) is undertaking the requirements development for electrification of Tactical and Combat Vehicles in September 2020; General Wesley had previously announced a plan in April 2020 for the modernization of Tactical and Combat Vehicles using the JLTV electrification plan as a prototype template of the electrification process.
After prototype JLTV electrification, the Army is seeking ideas for an electrified Light Reconnaissance Vehicle (LRV) by 2025. The LRVs would complement the Infantry Squad Vehicles (ISVs), and electrified versions of Stryker Infantry Carrier Vehicle - Dragoon which are already fielded. GM Defense has since converted one of its bid vehicles for the ISV to an all-electric version.

Mobile Protected Firepower approved by joint requirements oversight council. Two vendors were selected to build competing prototype light tanks (MPF), with contract award in 2022. A unit of 82nd Airborne Division will begin assessment of prototype MPFs beginning in March 2020. General Dynamics Land Systems will build 42 MPFs, a battalion of light infantry tanks by FY2025.

Optionally Manned Fighting Vehicle (OMFV): soliciting input, in requirements definition stage; the 2018 requirement was that 2 OMFVs fit in a C-17. A request for proposal  for a vehicle prototype was placed 29 March 2019. On 16 January 2020 the Optionally Manned Fighting Vehicle solicitation was cancelled, as a middle tier acquisition in its early stage; the requirements and schedule are being revisited. The FY2021 budget request has been adjusted accordingly.

An Army development team will not be an OMFV competitor as of 17 September 2020.
NGCV optionally manned fighting vehicle: OMFV is getting some industry silhouettes which may be incorporated in digital designs for 2023, prototypes by 2025. A fifth OMFV bidder (a small business) is still a contender in the competition, includes large consortia. However, Mark Cancian points out that OMFV might not be suitable for a pivot to the Pacific theater.

A hybrid electrified Bradley Fighting Vehicle is slated for January 2022 by RCCTO.
Robotic Combat Vehicles (RCVs):  General Murray envisions that by FY2023 critical decisions will be made on RCVs after years of experimentation. Russia's Uran-9 (Уран-9) is not a robotic tank; rather it is an unmanned radio-controlled drone tank. A Next Generation main battle tank remains a § Future concept.

Future Vertical Lift 

Future Vertical Lift (FVL) is a plan for a family of military helicopters for the United States Armed Forces using common elements such as sensors avionics and engines. Five different sizes of aircraft are to be developed, to replace the wide range of rotorcraft in use.  The project began in 2009. By 2014,  the SB-1 Defiant and V-280 Valor had been chosen as demonstrators. On 5 December 2022 Bell's V-280 was chosen for the Future Long-Range Assault Aircraft; the first phase of the contract award will be for a virtual prototype.
 The FVL CFT has secured approval for the requirements in all four of its Lines of Effort:

Future Vertical Lift will use the DoD modular open systems approach (MOSA), an integrated business and technical strategy in FARA, and in FLRAA Both FLRAA and FARA are to enter service by Fiscal Year 2030. By abstracting its requirements, the Army was able to request prototypes which used new technologies.

Joint Multi-Role Technology Demonstrator (JMR-TD) prototypes are to be built by two teams to replace Sikorsky UH-60 Blackhawks with Future Long-Range Assault Aircraft (FLRAA). The tilt-rotor FLRAA demonstrator by Bell is flying unmanned (October 2019); it logged 100 hours of flight testing by April 2019. Both Bell and Sikorsky-Boeing received contract awards to compete in a risk reduction effort (CDRRE) for FLRAA in March 2020. The risk reduction effort will be a 2-phase, 2-year competition. The competition will transition technologies (powertrain, drivetrain and control laws) from the previous demonstrators (JMR-TDs) of 2018–2019 to requirements, conceptual designs, and acquisition approach for the weapon system. The Army wants flight testing of FLRAA prototypes beginning in 2025, with fielding to the first units in 2030.

The Future Attack Reconnaissance Aircraft (FARA) is smaller than FLRAA. The Army's requests for proposals (RFPs) for FARA were due in December 2018;

A long range precision munition for the Army's aircraft will begin its program of design and development. In the interim, the Army is evaluating the Spike 18 mile range non-line of sight missile on its Boeing AH-64E Apache  attack helicopters.

Unmanned UH-60
An unmanned UH-60 Black Hawk flew pilotless in July 2022. An FVL FLRAA (JMR-TD) flew unmanned in 2019.

Mobile, Expeditionary Network 
In Fiscal Year 2019, the network CFT will leverage Network Integration Evaluation 18.2 for experiments with brigade level scalability. By 2022, 4 separate network Capability Sets were in-process, simultaneously ('21, '23, '25, and '27).

Integrated Tactical Network (ITN) "is not a new or separate network but rather a concept"—PEO C3T.  Avoid overspecifying the requirements for Integrated Tactical Network Information Systems Initial Capabilities Document. Instead, meet operational needs, such as interoperability with other networks, and release ITN capabilities incrementally.
Up through 2028, every two years the Army will insert new capability sets for ITN (Capability sets '21, '23, '25, etc.). and take feedback from Soldier-led experiment & evaluation. However, the Army's commitment to a 'campaign of learning' showed more paths:
Firestorm was made possible by a mesh network—improvising an MEO, and then a GEO satellite link between JBLM to YPG. There are plans to have a Project Convergence 2021. The Army fielded a data fabric at Project Convergence 2020; this will eventually be part of JADC2.
Five Rapid Innovation Fund (RIF) awards were granted to five vendors via the Network CFT and PEO C3T's request for white papers.  That request, for a roll-on/roll-off kit that integrates all functions of mission command on the Army Network, was posted at the National Spectrum Consortium and FedBizOpps, and yielded awards within eight months. Two more awards are forthcoming.
The Rapid Capabilities Office (RCO)'s Emerging Technologies Office structured a competition to find superior AI/Machine Learning algorithms for electronic warfare, from a field of 150 contestants, over a three-month period.
The Multi-Domain Operations Task Force (MDO TF) is standing up an experimental Electronic Warfare Platoon to prototype an estimated 1000 EW soldiers needed for the 31 BCTs of the active Army.
Capability Set '21 fields ITN to selected infantry brigades to prepare for IVAS Integrated vision goggles. Expeditionary signal brigades get enhanced satellite communications. 
1/82nd Airborne, 173rd Airborne, 3/25th ID, and 3/82nd Airborne infantry brigades will all have fielded the Integrated Tactical Network Capability Set '21 by year-end 2021. 2nd Cavalry Regiment is getting Capability Set '21 on Strykers,  which will test the CS'23 network design on Strykers early.	
Integrated Tactical Network (ITN) Capability Set '23 is prototyping JADC2 communications and the data fabric, to LEO (Low earth orbit) and to MEO (Medium earth orbit) satellites, as continued in Project Convergence 2021 in Yuma Proving Ground. Capability Set '23 has passed its Critical design review (CDR).
Integrated Tactical Network (ITN) Capability Set '25 will implement JADC2, according to the acting head of the Network CFT. Command post footprint reduced.
Integrated Tactical Network (ITN) Capability Set '27 design goals are being laid out.

G-6 John Morrison is seeking to unify the battlefield networks of ITN, and IEN (Enterprise Network), as of September 2021.
An Army leader dashboard from PEO Enterprise Information Systems is underway. The dashboard is renamed Vantage. The  dashboard has streamlined and connected data updates for deployments. Cloud-service-provider agnostic abstraction layers are in use, which allows merging the staff work in G-3/5/7 for cyber/EW (electronic warfare), mission command, and space. The "seamless, real-time flow of data" across multiple domains (land, sea, air, space, and cyberspace) is an objective for G-6, as well as the sensor-to-shooter work at Futures command.
Fort Irwin, Fort Hood, Joint Base San Antonio, and Joint Base Lewis McChord have 5G experiments on wireless connectivity between forward operating bases and tactical operations centers, as well as nonaircraft Augmented reality support of maintenance and training.
The Multi-domain task forces (MDTFs) will be used to expose any capability gaps in the Unified network plan.

Air, Missile Defense 
Air, Missile Defense (AMD): In 2022 plans for FY2023 cruise missile defense were underway.

Integrated Air and Missile Defense Battle Command System  

The United States Army Integrated Air and Missile Defense [IAMD] Battle Command System (IBCS) is a plug and fight network intended to let any defensive sensor (such as a radar) feed its data to any available weapon system (colloquially, "connect any sensor to any shooter"). The system is designed to shoot down short, medium, and intermediate range ballistic missiles in their terminal phase by intercepting with a hit-to-kill approach. 
IBCS has been developed since 2004, with the aim to replace Raytheon's Patriot missile (SAM) engagement control station (ECS), along with seven other forms of ABM defense command systems. In 2022, IBCS successfully completed initial operational test and evaluation (IOT&E).

The IBCS program is part of the Army's Integrated Air and Missile Defense (IAMD) effort.
IBCS aims to create an integrated network of air defense sensors, such as AN/MPQ-64 Sentinel and AN/TPS-80 G/ATOR, AN/MPQ-53, AN/MPQ-65A and GhostEye (LTAMDS) in Patriot missile system, GhostEye MR in NASAMS, AN/TPY-2 in Terminal High Altitude Area Defense (THAAD) and Ground-Based Midcourse Defense (GMD), AN/SPY-1 and AN/SPY-6 in Aegis BMD, and AN/APG-81 in Lockeed Martin F-35 Lightning II, allowing them to interoperate with IBCS engagement control stations. IBCS engagement stations will be able to take fine control of army-fielded air-defense systems like Patriot and THAAD, directing radar positioning and suggesting recommended launchers; naval, aerial and Marine systems will only be able to share either radar tracks or raw radar data with the IBCS network. The Army requires all new missiles and air-defense systems to implement IBCS support.

Northrop Grumman was announced as the prime contractor in 2010; between 2009 and 2020, the Army had spent $2.7 billion on the program.

By May 2015, a first flight test integrated a networked S-280 engagement operations center with radar sensor and interceptor launchers. This test demonstrated a missile kill with the first interceptor. By Army doctrine, two interceptors were launched against that missile. By April 2016, IBCS tests demonstrated sensor fusion from disparate data streams, identification and tracking of targets, selection of appropriate kill vehicles, and interception of the targets, but the "IBCS software was 'neither mature nor stable'". On 1 May 2019 an Engagement Operations Center (EOC) for the Integrated Air and Missile Defense (IAMD) Battle Command System (IBCS) was delivered to the Army, at Huntsville, Alabama.

In July 2019, the TRADOC capability manager (TCM) for Strategic Missile Defense (SMD) has accepted the charter for DOTMLPF for the Space and Missile Defense Command (SMDC/ARSTRAT).

On 30 August 2019 at Reagan Test Site on Kwajalein atoll, THAAD Battery E-62 successfully intercepted a medium range ballistic missile (MRBM), using a radar which was well-separated from the interceptors; the next step tested Patriot missiles as interceptors while using THAAD radars as sensors; a THAAD radar has a longer detection range than a Patriot radar. THAAD Battery E-62 engaged the MRBM without knowledge of just when the medium range ballistic missile had launched.

IBCS' second limited user test was scheduled to take place in the fourth quarter of FY20.

In July 2020 a Limited user test (LUT) of IBCS was initiated at WSMR; the test ran until mid-September 2020. The LUT was originally scheduled for May but was delayed to handle the COVID-19 safety protocols. The first of several LUTs of IBCS, by an ADA battalion was successfully run in August 2020. IBCS successfully integrated data from two sensors (Sentinel and Patriot radars), and shot down two drones (cruise missile surrogates) with two Patriot missiles in the presence of jamming; In the week after, by 20 August 2020 two more disparate threats (cruise missile and ballistic missile) were launched and intercepted; the ADA battalion then ran hundreds of drills denoting hundreds of threats for the remainder of the IBCS tests (the increased effort occupied the entire unit); the real-world data serve as a sanity check for Monte Carlo simulations of an array of physical scenarios amounting to hundreds of thousands of cases. IBCS created a "single uninterrupted composite track of each threat" and handed off each threat for separate disposition by the air and missile defense's integrated fire control network (IFCN). The same battalion running the LUT, for both IBCS, and LTAMDS radar, is scheduled to run the Initial Operational Test & Evaluation (IOTE) in 2021, and is to run well into 2022.

In September 2020 a Joint exercise against cruise missiles demonstrated AI-based kill chains which can be formulated in seconds; One of the kills was by a "M109-based" tracked howitzer (a Paladin descendant).

The ranges of the IAMD defensive radars, when operated as a system, are thousands of miles. Cross-domain information from ground, air, and space sensors was passed to a fire control system at Project Convergence 2021 (PC21), via IBCS, during one of the use case scenarios. At PC21 IBCS fused sensor data from an F-35, tracking the target, and passing that data to AFATDS (Army Field Artillery Tactical Data System). The F-35 then served as a spotter for artillery fire on ground target data. More than 100 technologies were prototyped in experiments at PC21.

By August 2020, a second Limited User Test (LUT) at White Sands Missile Range was able to detect, track, and intercept near-simultaneous low-altitude targets as well as a tactical ballistic missile, over several separate engagements. Army doctrine can now be updated to allow the launch of a single Patriot against a single target.
By 2021 the Army awarded a $1.4 billion contract to Northrop Grumman for IBCS.

Raytheon's new GhostEye radar (previously Lower Tier Air and Missiles Defense Sensor, LTAMDS) replaces the Patriot AN/SPY-65A radar. GhostEye will be able to feed raw sensor data to IBCS, and it will fit on a C-17 Globemaster.  GhostEye is engineered to operate with much greater sensitivity, improved range and ability to track smaller, faster-moving targets. It uses three fixed 120-degree arrays  to seamlessly  find, discriminate and track fast-approaching threats using a 360-degree protection envelope. The arrays are overlapping to close “blind spots” and maintain a track if an attacking missile shifts course in flight. GhostEye can detect the precise shape, size, distance and speed of an approaching threat with high-fidelity sensor “pings”; its semiconductor gallium nitride (GaN) emitters allow increased resolution, accuracy, and power efficiency. The fielding of four LTAMDS radars to a battalion is expected in 2023.

Although on 21 August 2019 the Missile Defense Agency (MDA) cancelled the $5.8 billion contract for the Redesigned kill vehicle (RKV), the Army's 100th Missile Defense Brigade will continue to use the Exo-Atmospheric Kill Vehicle (EKV). The current Ground-based Midcourse Defense (GMD) programs continue per plan, with 64 ground-based interceptors (GBIs) in the missile fields for 2019 planned. Command and Control Battle Management and Communications (C2BMC), was developed by the Missile defense agency (as a development organization) and is integrated with GMD, as demonstrated by FTG-11 on 25 March 2019. By March 2021, the decision to approve further development of the Next Generation Interceptor is on the agenda for the 35th Deputy Secretary of Defense Kathleen Hicks. Hicks has extensive background in defense modernization; the 28th Secretary of Defense Lloyd Austin has recused himself from acquisition matters.

On 24 February 2022 THAAD radar and TFCC (THAAD Fire Control & Communication) demonstrated their interoperability with Patriot PAC-3 MSE missiles; in other words IBCS can engage targets using both THAAD and Patriot interceptors, freed of a siloed solution (THAAD-only / Patriot-only, etc.). For example, in a scenario where a THAAD system has to conserve its All-Up-Rounds, IBCS can calculate which targets are within the reach of its PAC-3 MSE interceptors, and instead fire the PAC-3 interceptors at those targets within range.

IBCS is projected to be at its initial operating capability (IOC) in Fiscal year 2022. In January 2018 James H. Dickinson and Richard Formica broached the integration of strategic fires and air/missile defense in the multi-domain task force.

High Energy Laser Tactical Vehicle Demonstrator 

A contract for the U.S. Army Space and Missile Defense Command/Army Forces Strategic Command's High Energy Laser Tactical Vehicle Demonstrator (HEL TVD) laser system, a 100 kilowatt laser demonstrator for use on the Family of Medium Tactical Vehicles, was awarded 15 May 2019 to Dynetics-Lockheed. A 300 kilowatt laser demonstrator (HEL-IFPC) effort supersedes the HEL TVD (after the critical design review). System test at White Sands Missile Range in 2023.

Indirect fire protection capability (IFPC) Multi-mission launcher (MML) fielding 50 kW lasers on Strykers in 2021 and 2022 to two battalions per year.
Maneuver short-range air defense (MSHORAD) with laser cannon prototypes in 2020,  In July 2021 RCCTO conducted a combat shootoff on just how to control pointing these high-energy lasers. Raytheon is providing the high energy laser (Directed Energy Maneuver-Short Range Air Defense system —DE M-SHORAD) for the Strykers in 2022.
RCCTO has awarded a contract to build a 300 kW high-energy laser (HEL) for the Army in FY2022, capable of defending against airborne threats, by acquiring, tracking, and maintaining the HEL's aimpoint on the threat until it goes down.

Soldier lethality 
Soldier Lethality:
Next Generation Squad Weapon Program: Expect 100,000 to be fielded to the Close Combat Force: Infantry, Armor, Cavalry, Special Forces, and Combat engineers. Tests at Fort Benning in 2019. —Chief of Staff Milley
Nine thousand systems, with two drones apiece are being purchased over a three-year period for the 9-man infantry squads heading to Afghanistan.
Integrated Visual Augmentation System (IVAS) —an augmented reality display— allows soldiers to use multiple sensors to fight. IVAS was put on hold in March 2022, with Congress budgeting $349 million in favor of drones instead. An initial IVAS buy was approved in September 2022 after a six month hold. An improved IVAS is being sought after finding that some soldiers are being physically affected from wearing the goggles.
Enhanced night vision goggles (ENVG)-B, will be fielded to an Armor brigade combat team (ABCT) going to South Korea in October 2019
A CCDC program which instrumented a battalion with sleep monitors, Redibands, and smartwatches to detect exertion, detected soldiers with elevated heart rates, indicating the beginnings of a streptococcus infection. This condition was detected by the medics, and would have impacted the battalion, detected before deploying to Afghanistan.
Synthetic training environment (STE)—a CFT devoted to an augmented reality system to aid planning, using mapping techniques, even at squad level will begin fielding by 2021. In October 2019 the Synthetic Training Environment (STE) prototype is being used by Special Operations for planning actual missions. Development for the Synthetic Training Environment (STE) is to be accelerated to meet MDO and JADC2 training demands.
On the battlefield of the future, where no headquarters is safe for long, the commander's task is:
"Avoid being detected and targeted".
"Work through and survive attacks".
"Rapidly recover from losses".
Thus the commander has to be continuously aware of the current status (that is: alive or not) of the deputy commander (and the staff) so that the mission can be completed.

Enterprise campaign planning 
In 2019 DoD planners are exercising Doctrine, organization, training, materiel, leadership and education, personnel, and facilities (DOTMLPF) in planning, per the National Defense Strategy (NDS),
in the shift from counterinsurgency (COIN) to competition with near-peer powers. The evaluations from planners' scenarios will be determining materiel and organization by late 2020.

Futures Command is formulating multiyear Enterprise campaign plans, in 2019. The planning process includes Army Test and Evaluation Command (ATEC), AFC's cross-functional teams (CFTs), Futures and Concepts (FCC), Combat Capabilities Development Command (CCDC), and Army Reserve's Houston-based 75th Innovation Command. At this stage, one goal is to formulate the plans in simple, coherent language which nests within the national security strategic documents.

By October 2022 Field Manual 3-0 could state that The Army Operating Concept was that 'Multi-domain Operations are at the root of all Army operations',

Futures 

AFC faces multiple futures, both as threat and opportunity. The Army's warfighting directive, viz., "to impose the nation's political will on its enemy" —Chief of Staff Milley, is to be ready for multiple near-term futures. 
Under Secretary McCarthy notes that Gen. Murray functions as the Army's Chief Investments Officer (more precisely, its "chief futures modernization investment officer"). Funding for the top six priorities could mean that existing programs might be curtailed.

In the top six priorities:

LRPF Long range precision fires
Hypersonic materiel development: the Strategic long range cannon (SLRC), for a hypersonic projectile,  is meant to have a range up to 1,000 nautical miles. An early ballistic test took place at Naval Support Facility Dahlgren, as announced at AUSA in October 2019. 
ERCA development at Picatinny Arsenal: evaluate several manufacturing technologies, tied to the XM1113 munition.
 Targeting with thousand-mile missiles, "streamlining the sensor-shooter link at every echelon"—BG John Rafferty, in Integrated fire
  NGCV Next generation combat vehicle
Much smaller and lighter ground combat vehicles, optionally unmanned (Dedicated short-range communications for robotic vehicles 
If robotic combat vehicles (RCVs) do not need to be manned, neither would they need to be armored (see Uran-9); use of sensors and batteries could replace the armor. Soldiers have learned to remotely operate the weapons on such RCVs in several days; the CCDC RCV Center and CFT are placing RCV prototypes and the Soldier's vehicle prototypes in company-level scenarios in Europe, in 2020 and forward. Modified Bradley Fighting Vehicles and M113s at Fort Carson went through unit-level operations to gain experience with RCVs in July and August 2020. Future breaching operations will be affected in detail by the robotic breaching concept, according to the panel at the AUSA October 2020 meeting.
In October 2020 the Army's Chief of Staff reminded the force that "The time is now" to modernize for the future, including how the Army develops the systems themselves; if a soldier can now use IVAS to shoot around corners and hit the target, if soldiers and their units can use STE (synthetic training environment) to depict the mission's terrain and train for the mission before the conflict occurs, if deploying robotic reconnaissance vehicles at the time of the mission can smoke out defenses before committing manned combat vehicles against those defenses, then even light vehicles can transport soldiers in conflict, and precision fires can neutralize threats against those soldiers in a conflict. STE can depict these scenarios.
Robotic warfare, as a concept or capability at the Joint Corps echelon, was demonstrated at the operational level using Joint Warfighting assessment (JWA) 18.1 in April 2018.
JWA 19 (April–May 2019): I Corps, at Joint base Lewis-McChord, is getting modernization training on the robotic complex breaching concept (RCBC), and the command post computing environment (CPCE) from Joint modernization command (JMC) training staff.
Create decisive lethality: Robotic experiments
Jen Judson reports that Lt. Gen. Eric Wesley is proposing that the brigades begin to electrify their vehicles using hybrid, or all-electric propulsion.
Smaller brigades and stronger division-level maneuver, with robotic aerial reconnaissance vehicles, robotic combat vehicles (RCVs), and long-range precision fires (LRPFs) are under consideration.
Modified M2 Bradleys (MET-Ds) and other RCVs operating at Fort Carson, and in Europe have used robotic software to operate the vehicles, for both logistics and also for combat maneuver. As of August 2020, the RCVs are able to perform limited waypoint navigation; multiple vehicles can be controlled by one human operator.
FVL "Our new approach is really to prototype as much as we can to help us identify requirements, so our reach doesn't exceed our grasp. ... A good example is Future Vertical Lift: The prototyping has been exceptional." —Secretary of the Army Mark Esper
The Future Attack Reconnaissance Aircraft (FARA) scout helicopter prototypes are to be designed to fly along urban streets, to survive air defenses. Five design vendors were selected, with downselect to two for prototyping by February 2020. 
These aircraft are envisioned as platforms for utilizing sensor networks to control and enable weapons delivery, as demonstrated in a 2019 experiment. In preparation for FVL platforms, the FVL CFT demonstrated a 2020 Spike non-line of sight missile launch from an Apache gunship at Yuma Proving Ground, for extended range capability; a forward air launch of an unmanned sensor aircraft (UAS) from a helicopter was demonstrated at YPG as well.
Mobile & Expeditionary Network / MDO Multi-domain operations

In the battlefield of the future, where nowhere is safe for long, "you will miss opportunities to get to positions of advantage if you don't synthesize the data very quickly"—LTG Wesley (AI for multi-domain command and control: MDC2) "Finding and engaging high-value relocatable ground systems within rapid timelines" is the Air Force's operational objective in this JADC2 exercise (December 2019) —Eliahu Norwood, Greg Grant, and Tyler Lewis.
ISR (intelligence, surveillance, and reconnaissance) needs to match the range of the upcoming LRPF (Long range precision fires) and thousand-nautical-mile missile standoff capability of the Army. Soldiers on the ground are now able to receive satellite ISR.
Cybersecurity RAND simulations show Blue losses
Cyber warfare / urban warfare / Underground warfare / Multi-domain combined maneuver Robotic swarms are a tactic under consideration. 
Assured Positioning, Navigation and Timing (A-PNT) Zephyr, a solar-powered drone successfully stayed aloft at Yuma Proving Ground for nearly 26 days, at times descending to 55,000 feet to avoid adverse weather conditions, while remaining well above the altitudes flown by commercial aircraft, and landing per plan in the summer of 2018, to meet other testing commitments. A 2022 test of Zephyr S began on 15 June 2022; as of 22 July 2022 the drone was still flying at 70,000 feet in the stratosphere, and has broken its previous non-stop record. However on 19 August, after 64 days, Zephyr S lost 20,000 feet of altitude, before suddenly plummeting at high speed in a presumed crash at YPG. Zephyr yielded over 1500 hours of stratospheric data during the mission. This surpasses Airbus' goal of 60 days of unmanned service, which included international flight from Arizona to Belize, and back. Zephyr would have broken the world record for continuous flight, had it lasted just a few more hours. In April 2021 a Vanilla UAS demonstrated 45 hour 23 minute unrefueled flight from Point Mugu to the Pacific Fleet's (PACFLT) UxS IBP 2021 exercise.
An A-PNT event is scheduled at WSMR for August 2019
Prototype jam-resistant GPS kits are being fielded to 2nd Cavalry Regiment in US European Command (EUCOM) before year-end 2019. More than 300 Strykers of the 2nd Cavalry Regiment are being fitted with the Mounted Assured Precision Navigation & Timing System (MAPS), with thousands more planned for EUCOM.
A Modular Open Systems Approach (MOSA) to Positioning, Navigation and Timing (PNT) is under development.
Low Earth orbit satellites for Assured Positioning, Navigation and Timing—"When you look at the sheer number of satellites that go up and the reduced cost to do it, it gives us an array of opportunities on how to solve the problems" in A-PNT
CCDC Army Research Laboratory (ARL) researchers have proposed and demonstrated a way for small ground-based robots with mounted antennas to configure phased arrays, a technique which usually takes a static laboratory to develop. Instead the researchers used robots to covertly create and focus a highly directional parasitic array (see Yagi antenna).
CCDC Army Research Laboratory (ARL): ARL's Army Research Office is funding researchers at University of Texas at Austin, and University of Lille who have built a new 5G component using hexagonal boron nitride which can switch at performant speeds, while remaining 50 times more energy-efficient than current materials—the "thinnest known insulator with a thickness of 0.33 nanometers".
CCDC Army Research Laboratory (ARL): ARL's Army Research Office (ARO) is seeking diamond colloids, microscopic spheres which can assemble bottom-up into promising structures for laser action.
Newly developed materials with nanoscale trusses could serve as armor or coatings.
A demonstration of proof of concept allows Soldiers to communicate their position using a wearable tracking unit. The technology allows soldiers (or robots) to prosecute a fight even indoors or underground, even if GPS were lost during a NavWar.
Air, Missile Defense is being reframed, as more integrated.
Integrated Air and Missile Battle Command System (IBCS) award, including next software build. $238 million also funds initial prototypes of the command and control system for fielding in FY22.
 Hypersonic glide vehicle launch preparations, beginning in 2020, and continuing with launches every six months.
At Naval Air Weapons Station China Lake an FVL CFT-sponsored demonstration of interconnected sensors handed-off the control of a glide munition which had been launched from a Grey Eagle unmanned aircraft system (UAS). During the flight of that munition, another group of sensors picked up a higher-priority target; another operator at the Tactical Operations Center (TOC) redirected the glide munition to the higher-priority target and destroyed it. See: § Air-launched effects
Indiscriminate use of thousands of offensive missiles against Ukraine "shows we should expect these weapons to become a common feature of 21st-century conflict" —unnamed DoD official, 27 October 2022.
Contested logistics are needed for Ukraine's Army, in a time span of months as of April 2022.
Soldier lethality
Sensor-to-shooter prototype for multi-domain battle, 2019 operational assessment: Air Force RCO / Army RCO / Network CFT
Night vision goggles thermal polarimetric camera. Integrated Visual Augmentation System (IVAS) The Synthetic Training Environment (STE) is available to some of the troops outfitted with IVAS. Christine Wormuth, 25th Secretary of the Army, has identified the Army's work on a Common operating picture (COP) as  foundational for the operation of the Joint services.
CCDC ARL researchers are developing a flexible, waterproof, lithium-ion battery of any size and shape, for soldiers to wear; the electrolyte is water itself. In 2020 the batteries were engineering prototypes; by 2021 soldiers will wear the battery for themselves for the first time.
CCDC ARL and DoE's PNNL are examining the solid-electrolyte-interphase (SEI) as it first forms during the initial charging of a Lithium-ion battery. They have found an inner SEI (thin, dense, and inorganic—most likely lithium oxide) between the copper electrode, and an outer SEI which is organic and permeable—a finding which will be useful when building future batteries.
CCDC ARL and MIT researchers are formulating atomically thin materials to be layered upon soldiers' equipment and clothing for MDO information display and processing.
Integrated, wearable cabling for capabilities such as IVAS, NGSW, or Nett Warrior are under development; the potential exists to reduce 20 pounds of batteries to half that weight.
CCDC ARL is undertaking an Essential research program (ERP) in the processes underlying additive manufacturing (3D printing), which is applicable to munitions. 
Natick Soldier RDEC has awarded an Other Transaction Authority (OTA) contract to prototype soldier exoskeletons which augment human leg strength under harsh conditions.
 DEVCOM Chem Bio Center (CBC) is developing sensors to detect possible hazardous contamination.
Plans for the Infantry Squad Vehicle (ISV) are underway. An ISV is meant to be airdropped for a squad of nine paratroopers. The GM design was selected; first unit is expected at 1/82nd AB division in February 2021.
Assured pointing, navigation and tracking (A-PNT) devices are being miniaturized, with increased redundant positioning sources. This aids wearability.
In September 2019 in the Maneuver CoE's Battle Lab at Fort Benning, OneSAF simulations of a platoon augmented by UAS drones, ground robots, and AI were able to dislodge a defending force 3 times larger, repeatedly. But by current doctrine, a near-battalion would have been required to accomplish that mission.

Waypoint 2028 and the Army of 2030

From 2022 to 2028, the Army, in multi-domain operation, has designated the Corps to be the Unit of Employment; the Division echelon to be the Unit of Action; Brigades are Units for Close combat. Divisions are purpose-built designs:

 Joint forcible entry airborne, and air assault;
 Standard heavy, and light; and Heavy Reinforced (formerly Penetration) divisions.

By 2022 the 25th Secretary of the Army, Christine Wormuth was able to announce the top six areas for the Army of 2030: 1) improved Intelligence, surveillance, and reconnaissance (ISR); 2) "Coordination at greater speed"; 3) "Win the Fires fight"; 4) §concealment via improved mobility and reduced signature; 5) "talk often and quickly"; and 6) logistics.

 

Army of 2040
By October 2022 the 25th Secretary of the Army, Christine Wormuth could charge the 2nd commander of Futures Command with proponency for the Army of 2040. Futures Command hosted the inaugural Army Future Readiness Conference in Austin 13–15 December 2022, covering the design of the Army of 2040. The conference was a synchronization meeting for AFC, AMC, TRADOC, FORSCOM, and Headquarters Department of the Army. The meeting was to support the Army Campaign Plan and to execute the ReARMM readiness model in future synchronization meetings. A series of working groups, using the techniques of DOTMLPF to focus future meetings is underway.

Headquarters (HQ) 
AFC's headquarters is based in Austin, Texas where it spreads across three locations totaling 75,000 ft2; One location is a University of Texas System building at 210 W. Seventh St. in downtown Austin, on the 15th and 19th floors; the UT Regents were not going to charge rent to AFC until December 2019. The command began initial operations on 1 July 2018.

Value stream
In a hearing before Congress' House Armed Services Committee, the AFC commander projected that materiel will result from the value stream below, within a two-year time frame, from concept to Soldier. The commanding general is assisted by three deputy commanders.
 The Futures and Concepts Center, is led by LTG Scott McKean. The first commander was AFC deputy commanding general LTG (Ret.) Eric J. Wesley,  who sought 4 value streams for reducing the time invested to define a relevant requirement:
 Science and technology (S&T: discovery / collection of ideas with usable effects)
 Experiments (Testing of a system to a known expectation of effects, or else observation of that system, in the absence of a specific expectation of effects)
 Concepts development (Development of a relevant idea about that system)
 Requirements development (Development of the terms and conditions for that system)
 Combat Development element, Army Futures Command.  LTG Richard R. Coffman is the deputy commander. He assists the commander with efforts to assess and integrate the future operational environment, emerging threats, and technologies to develop and deliver concepts, requirements, and future force designs to posture the Army for the future.
 The Capability development integration directorate (CDID) of each Center of Excellence (CoE), works with its CFT and its research, development and engineering center (RDEC) to develop operational experiments and prototypes to test. 
 The Battle Labs and The Research Analysis Center (TRAC) prototype and analyze the concepts to test.
 JMC is capable of providing live developmental experiments to test those concepts or capabilities, "scalable from company level to corps, amid tough, realistic multi-domain operations".
 RDECOM becomes the Combat Capabilities Development Command (CCDC, or DEVCOM), part of the Combat Development element, on 3 February 2019.
 Futures Command's Thomas H. Todd III, Lt. Gen. USA, is Deputy Commanding General of Acquisition and Systems (in 2018, denoted Combat Systems).
Gen. Robert Abrams has tasked III Corps with providing Soldier feedback for the Next Generation Combat Vehicles CFT, XVIII Corps for the Soldier feedback on the Soldier lethality CFT,  the Network CFT, as well as the Synthetic training CFT, and I Corps for the Long Range Precision Fires CFT.
Combat Systems refines, engineers, and produces the developed solutions from Combat Development. 
An analysis by AMSAA can then assess that concept or capability, as a promising system for a materiel development decision.

Army Chief of Staff Milley is looking for AFC to attain full operational capability (FOC) by August 2019. By 2022 the Army's unclassified Multi-Domain Operations concept (which had been initially formulated by Futures Command) was disclosed to the public.

List of commanding generals 

On 16 July 2018, Lieutenant General John M. Murray was nominated for promotion and appointment as Army Futures Command's first commanding general. and his appointment was confirmed on 20 August 2018 and he assumed command during the official activation ceremony of AFC on 24 August 2018, in Austin, Texas.
Murray relinquished command of AFC on 3 December 2021. Lieutenant General James E. Rainey (later promoted to general on 7 October 2022) became AFC's second commanding general on 4 October 2022.

See also
 Military acquisition#In the United States
 Military budget of the United States
 Command systems in the United States Army
 Air and Missile Defense
 Combat Capabilities Development Command Soldier Center#Soldier Lethality
 Manhattan Project
 Space Warfighting Analysis Center

Notes

References

External links
 
 See AFC Events for the upcoming events: Association of the United States Army (AUSA) 26–28 March 2019: Multi-Domain Operations. Previous event: 8–10 October 2018 

2018 establishments in the United States
Buildings and structures in Austin, Texas
Commands of the United States Army
Military units and formations established in 2018
Futures